Gregory Fiennes, 10th Baron Dacre (bef. 25 June 1539 – 25 September 1594) was an English courtier.

He was the son of Thomas Fiennes, 9th Baron Dacre (c. 1515–1541) and Mary Neville. He was baptized at Hurstmonceux, Sussex, on 25 June 1539 and he may have been named after Thomas Cromwell's son, Gregory.

His father was convicted of the murder of a gamekeeper and hanged like a common criminal at Tyburn in 1541, and in the aftermath, the family was stripped of its lands and titles by Henry VIII.

In the following years, his mother battled to have the properties restored on behalf of her children, and on her ascension in 1558, Queen Elizabeth restored the title of Baron Dacre to Gregory, his elder brother Thomas having died of the plague at age 15.

Gregory Fiennes is a sitter with his mother in a significant portrait by Hans Eworth.
 
In 1565, he married Anne Sackville (d. 1595), daughter of Sir Richard Sackville and Winifred Brydges. They had one daughter, Elizabeth, who died young.

He died on 25 September 1594 at Chelsea and is buried at Chelsea Old Church within a magnificent marble tomb with his wife and daughter. He was succeeded by his sister Margaret Fiennes, 11th Baroness Dacre.

Notes

References

External links

 Gregory Fiennes 10th Baron Dacre at TudorPlace.com

1539 births
1594 deaths
People from Herstmonceux
16th-century English nobility
Gregory
10
Burials at Chelsea Old Church